Oleksandr Zubrihin (born October 28, 1974) is a boxer from Ukraine who won the bronze medal in the Men's Middleweight (– 75 kg) division at the 2000 European Amateur Boxing Championships in Tampere, Finland.

Zubrihin represented his native country at the 2000 Summer Olympics in Sydney, Australia. There he was stopped in the quarterfinals of the Men's Middleweight division by Hungary's eventual bronze medalist Zsolt Erdei.

References
 sports-reference

1974 births
Living people
Middleweight boxers
Boxers at the 2000 Summer Olympics
Olympic boxers of Ukraine
Ukrainian male boxers